Nilgün is a Turkish feminine given name derived from the Persian word nilgun (نیلگون) meaning "indigo", "navy blue", "dark blue", "ultramarine". Nilgün may refer to:

 Nilgün Belgün (born 1953), Turkish actress; see Wish Me Luck (film)
 Nilgün Çelebi (born 1950), Turkish sociologist
 Nilgün Marmara (1958–1987), Turkish poet
 Sevdiye Nilgün Acar (born 1958), Turkish artist

See also
Nilay, a given name
Nilüfer (disambiguation)

Turkish feminine given names